Franz Mozart (3 October 1649 – 1693 or 1694) was a German mason and the grandfather of Leopold Mozart and great-grandfather of Wolfgang Amadeus Mozart.

The son of bricklayer  (1621–1685), Franz worked as a master mason and lived in the Fuggerei beginning in 1681. He was born in Augsburg and died there. A commemorative plaque at his house there, Mittlere Gasse Nr. 14, commemorates him today. The bookbinder Johann Georg Mozart was his son.

Franz Mozart is not to be confused with Franz Xaver Wolfgang Mozart, the youngest son of Wolfgang Amadeus Mozart.

External links 
 Die Mozartstadt Augsburg: „die vatterstadt meines papa“, regio-augsburg.de (German).

Franz
People from Augsburg
1649 births
1690s deaths